Elizabeth G. Loboa is an American biomedical engineer, inventor, researcher and academic administrator currently serving at Southern Methodist University (SMU) as provost and vice president for academic affairs.

Education
Loboa received a bachelor's degree in mechanical engineering from the University of California, Davis in 1995, followed by a master's degree in biomechanical engineering in 1997 and a doctorate in mechanical engineering in 2002 from Stanford University.

Career
Elizabeth G. Loboa, Ph.D., has served as SMU’s provost and vice president for academic affairs since July 6, 2020. Loboa brings a distinguished academic record and broad university leadership experience to her role. At SMU, she has successfully challenged community members to establish academic priorities for the next 3-5 years that will allow SMU to reach its full potential as a premier research and teaching university with global impact. As a trained biomedical engineer and established researcher, Loboa understands the importance of data to inform decisions and has spent considerable time in her first year establishing the data and reporting structures that will best shape and define the university’s academic strategy. She has a deep commitment to transparency and has opened up multiple avenues for consistent and open communication across the university.  

As the university’s chief academic officer, she is responsible for the overall quality of teaching, scholarship and research and all aspects of academic life, ranging from admissions and faculty development to supervision of SMU’s eight schools, library system, international programs, and SMU's eight degree granting schools: Cox School of Business, Dedman College of Humanities and Sciences, Dedman School of Law, Meadows School of the Arts, Lyle School of Engineering, Moody School of Graduate and Advanced Studies, Perkins School of Theology, and Simmons School of Education and Human Development. 

Prior to SMU, Loboa was the 11th dean of the University of Missouri’s College of Engineering since October 2015 and Ketcham Professor of the College of Engineering. Since 2018, and concurrent with her deanship, she served as vice chancellor for strategic partnerships. She was the first woman to serve as the College of Engineering's dean. During her decanal administration, she oversaw more than 140 faculty members and approximately 3,500 undergraduate and graduate students. Loboa previously served as associate chair and professor of the Joint Department of Biomedical Engineering at the University of North Carolina-Chapel Hill and North Carolina State University, and as a professor of materials science and engineering at North Carolina State University.

As one of the co-leaders, Loboa was instrumental in the largest capital research project ever undertaken at the University of Missouri - the $221 million NextGen Precision Health Institute. She worked to bring together the assets of five MU colleges -Agriculture, Food & Natural Resources, Arts & Science, Engineering, Medicine, and Veterinary Medicine - in partnership with the Truman VA Hospital, the MU Research Reactor, and MU Healthcare.

Loboa has been recognized for her work as an engineer, inventor, researcher and academic administrator. She is a fellow in the American Association for the Advancement of Science, the American Society of Mechanical Engineers, the National Academy of Inventors, the Biomedical Engineering Society and the American Institute for Medical and Biological Engineering. She has earned the Insight into Diversity Giving Back Award, the Sigma Xi Faculty Research Award, the Ralph E. Powe Junior Faculty Award and the UK-US Stem Cell Collaboration Development Award. Loboa also is the recipient of the University of California Davis Distinguished Engineering Alumni Medal as well as the Stanford University Distinguished Alumni Scholar Award.

Loboa serves on the advisory board of the AAAS Education Counsel Societies Consortium on Sexual Harassment in STEMM.  She is a member of the board of directors of Applied Optoelectronics, Inc. (AOI). She currently serves on the nominations committee for the American Institute for Medical and Biological Engineering. Loboa is a past member of the executive council of the Tissue Engineering and Regenerative Medicine International Society, Inc. Until becoming provost, Loboa served as a director for the Engineering Deans Council for the American Society for Engineering Education and on the AAU’s Strategy for Sexual Harassment and Gender Discrimination Advisory Board.

Accolades and awards
 Fellow, American Association for the Advancement of Science: Selected for "transformative academic leadership, promotion of diversity and inclusion in STEM fields, and impactful research in biomedical engineering, particularly for contributions in regenerative medicine and tissue engineering."
 Fellow, National Academy of Inventors: Selected for demonstrating “highly prolific spirits of innovation in creating or facilitating outstanding inventions that have made a tangible impact on the quality of life, economic development and welfare of society”. 
 Fellow, Biomedical Engineering Society: Selected for “exceptional achievements and contributions to the field of Biomedical Engineering, and for Inspired Leadership within the Biomedical Engineering Society”.
 Fellow, American Institute for Medical and Biological Engineering: Selected for “outstanding contributions to functional tissue engineering, regenerative medicine and wound healing as well as academic leadership and mentoring in engineering”. 
 Fellow, American Society of Mechanical Engineers: Selected for “exceptional engineering achievements and contributions to the engineering profession and to ASME".
 Insight into Diversity Giving Back Award
 University of California, Davis Distinguished Engineering Alumni Medal
 North Carolina State University Faculty Scholar Award (2012)
 North Carolina State University Chancellor’s Innovation Award (2011)
 Stanford University Distinguished Alumni Scholar Award (2010)
 UK-US Stem Cell Collaboration Development Award (2009)
 Sigma Xi Faculty Research Award (2009)
 Ralph E. Powe Junior Faculty Award (2005)

References

Year of birth missing (living people)
Living people
Women academic administrators
University of Missouri faculty
Stanford University School of Engineering alumni
University of California, Davis alumni
University of North Carolina at Chapel Hill faculty
North Carolina State University faculty
Southern Methodist University people